Theix is a former commune in the Morbihan department of Brittany in north-western France. On 1 January 2016, it was merged into the new commune Theix-Noyalo. Inhabitants of Theix are called in French Theixois.

Breton language
In 2008, there was 25,37% of the children attended the bilingual schools in primary education.

Sightseeing
Château du Plessis-Josso, a well-preserved 15th century fortified manor-house.

See also
Communes of the Morbihan department

References

External links

Official website 

Former communes of Morbihan